The 1974 Giro d'Italia was the 57th edition of the Giro d'Italia, one of cycling's Grand Tours. The Giro began in the Vatican City on 16 May, and Stage 12 occurred on 28 May with a stage from Forte dei Marmi. The race finished in Milan on 8 June.

Stage 12
28 May 1974 — Forte dei Marmi to Forte dei Marmi,  (ITT)

Rest day
29 May 1974

Stage 13
30 May 1974 — Forte dei Marmi to Pietra Ligure,

Stage 14
31 May 1974 — Pietra Ligure to Sanremo,

Stage 15
1 June 1974 — Sanremo to Valenza,

Stage 16
2 June 1974 — Valenza to Monte Generoso,

Stage 17
3 June 1974 — Como to Iseo,

Stage 18
4 June 1974 — Iseo to Sella Valsugana,

Stage 19
5 June 1974 — Borgo Valsugana to Pordenone,

Stage 20
6 June 1974 — Pordenone to Tre Cime di Lavaredo,

Stage 21
7 June 1974 — Misurina to Bassano del Grappa,

Stage 22
8 June 1974 — Bassano del Grappa to Milan,

References

1974 Giro d'Italia
Giro d'Italia stages